"Your Crown" is a song by the Danish dance-pop duo Infernal. It features the Danish singer and actress Xenia Lach-Nielsen, and was released as the fifth single from Infernal's debut album, Infernal Affairs, in 1999. The song is written by the German songwriter Nosie Katzmann, and it is the only Infernal single ever to feature a different female lead vocalist than Lina Rafn. It peaked at No. 2 on the Danish Airplay Chart, making it the most successful single from the album in terms of airplay.

Track listing

Personnel
Music and lyrics written by Nosie Katzmann
Lyrics performed by Xenia
Original production by Infernal, Michael Pfundheller, Kenneth Bager
"Your Crown" (Radio Mix) and (Club Mix): Remix and additional production by Michael Pfundheller
"Your Crown" (Pasta People's Whirl It Up Mix): Remix and additional production by Michael Parsberg and Jakob Stavnstrup
Mastered by Michael Pfundheller
Executive producer: Kenneth Bager

References

External links

1999 singles
Infernal (Danish band) songs
Songs written by Nosie Katzmann
1999 songs